Alexia "Ally" Ioannides (born January 1998) is an American actress, best known for playing Dylan Jones in the NBC drama series Parenthood from 2014 to 2015, and Tilda in the 2015-2019 AMC martial arts drama series Into the Badlands.

Early life 
Ioannides was born in Atlanta, Georgia, and raised in Park City, Utah. She moved to Burbank, California at age 14. She started her career as a stage actor playing in musicals at the Egyptian Theatre in Park City, as well as the Pioneer Theatre Company and Hale Center Theater in Salt Lake City, Utah. These theaters were also established many years ago.

Ioannides began elementary school at Pace Academy in Atlanta, then Trailside in Park City, and finally the Madeleine Choir School, where she sang in over 300 services and concerts, notably at the Utah Opera.

Career
Ioannides gained her first professional acting role at age 11 as Ester in the stage adaptation of A Christmas Story. She continued with roles in plays such as White Christmas, Annie, and The Sound of Music.

By 2015, Ioannides was focusing mostly on film and television, notably as Dylan Jones on NBC's Parenthood. Her 2013 short film with Mark Moses, The Tsarevich, was shown at various film festivals and another short, Stray (2014), put her the top 200 for consideration in the final season of the series "Project Greenlight".

Filmography

Film

Television

Stage

References

External links 

 

Living people
American people of Greek descent
Actresses from Atlanta
American film actresses
American television actresses
American stage actresses
American child actresses
21st-century American actresses
People from Park City, Utah
Actresses from Utah
1998 births